Charlie McDonnell (15 July 1936 – 7 June 2010) was an English professional footballer. He played as inside forward for Stork, Tranmere Rovers, Stockport County, Southport and Glentoran.

References 

Tranmere Rovers F.C. players
Stockport County F.C. players
Glentoran F.C. players
1936 births
2010 deaths
Southport F.C. players
Sportspeople from Birkenhead
Association football inside forwards
English footballers
English Football League players